Salisbury Downs is a suburb located in the City of Salisbury, Adelaide, South Australia. The suburb is bordered by Kings Road, the Little Para River, Burton Road, Spains Road and the Gawler railway line.

Salisbury Downs Post Office opened on 8 July 1991.

Facilities

Retail
Salisbury Downs includes Hollywood Plaza Shopping Centre, which is anchored by a Target discount department store and Coles and Woolworths supermarkets.

Schools
Schools in Salisbury Downs include Thomas More College, Riverdale Primary School and Salisbury Downs Primary School.

References